Janta Vedic College, also known as 'Jat College', is a college in Baraut in the Baghpat district in Uttar Pradesh, India. It is situated on the link road in Baraut. The College is managed by Jat Shiksha Sabha, a registered society established in 1920. It is affiliated to Chaudhary Charan Singh University.

College history

The college was first established as a high school on 20 October 1917. In 1949 it became an undergraduate college and, in 1956, a graduate college. the school offers education in agriculture, as well as the arts and science.

Campus
It has a campus on  near a tributary of the Yamuna canal. Janta Vedic College is situated in Baraut town of District Baghpat, Uttar Pradesh, India. The college premises are spread over more than 40 acres of land.

The three entry gates are named in memory of three famous 'Jat' alumni: Captain Ghasi Ram, Baba Shah Mal and Ch. Charan Singh.

Infrastructure
There are four faculties in the college: Visual Arts, Agriculture, Science and Physical Education. The college has 17 P.G. and 12 U.G. departments with a study centre of IGNOU. There is a huge central library. It has an open book section with a reading room and retro-graphic facilities.

There are two boy's and one girl's hostel. Staff residences are available to accommodate 16 staff members. The college has adequate sports facilities with a gymnasium and large playing grounds. An indoor stadium is under construction. 

There is an independent Dairy Farm which hosts about half-a-dozen milk cattle — buffaloes and cows. There is a Yagyashala where the reciting of Vedic Mantras is performed.

Faculties
 Faculty of Humanities
 Faculty of Arts
 Faculty of Science
 Faculty of Agriculture
 Faculty of Vocational Programmes
 Faculty of [commerce]

Courses
This college has 29 departments for every subject. Overall this college provides 10 courses at undergraduate and postgraduate levels. Currently this college provides P.G. level education to 514 students every year.

Notable alumni 
Dr Satya Pal Singh Mamber Lok Sabha,chancellor of Gurukul Kangdi University Haridwar, former Commissioner of police Mumbai and Former Minister of State HRD, Water Resources, River Development and Ganga Rejuvenation.
   Prof Ved Prkash Former Chairman UGC
   Swami Omvesh, MLA

References

External links
 

Universities and colleges in Uttar Pradesh
Science colleges in India
Arts colleges in India
Agricultural universities and colleges in Uttar Pradesh
Baraut
1917 establishments in India
Educational institutions established in 1917